Imputation can refer to:

Imputation (law), the concept that ignorance of the law does not excuse
Imputation (statistics), substitution of some value for missing data
Imputation (genetics), estimation of unmeasured genotypes
Theory of imputation, the theory that factor prices are determined by output prices
Imputation (game theory), a distribution that benefits each player who cooperates in a game
Imputed righteousness, a concept in Christian theology
Double imputation, a concept in Christian theology
Imputation of sin, a theory for the transmission of original sin from Adam to his progeny

See also 
Geo-imputation, a method in geographical information systems
Dividend imputation, a method of attributing a company's income tax to its shareholders